John Stewart Herrington (born May 31, 1939) is an American Republican politician.  He served as the United States Secretary of Energy under Ronald Reagan during his second term.

Biography
Herrington was born in Los Angeles, California, and earned his A.B. at Stanford University in 1961 and his LLB at the University of California School of Law (Hastings College) in 1964. While attending Stanford University, he joined the Delta Upsilon fraternity. He practiced law privately from 1965 to 1981, primarily in San Francisco, and publicly as deputy district attorney of Ventura County.

In the Reagan Administration, Herrington served as Assistant Secretary of the Navy (Manpower and Reserve Affairs) from 1981 to 1983, deputy assistant for presidential personnel from 1983 to 1985, and Secretary of Energy from 1985 to 1989.

After government service, Herrington was the Chairman of Harcourt, Brace, Jovanovich, Inc. He remains active in politics in his home state, having served for a time as Chairman of the California Republican Party. He owns Vic Stewart's, a nationally recognized steakhouse, with locations in Contra Costa County: Walnut Creek and Brentwood. He also develops real estate and acts as an advisor to numerous corporations.

Personal life and family
Herrington and his wife, the Honorable Lois Haight, had two children.

References

Clean Energy Corp bio
Forbes profile 

|-

1939 births
Living people
United States Secretaries of Energy
Reagan administration cabinet members
20th-century American politicians
California Republicans
Stanford University alumni
UC Berkeley School of Law alumni
United States Assistant Secretaries of the Navy